Turbo sazae is a species of sea snail, a marine gastropod mollusk, in the family Turbinidae, the turban snails. It had long been confused with Turbo cornutus and with Turbo japonicus before Fukuda (2017) pointed it out, even though being a popular edible shellfish in Japan.

Distribution
This species occurs in South Korea and Japan.

Consumption

Turbo sazae is enjoyed as a delicacy in Japan, where it is known as "". After cooking, the corkscrew-like animal can be drawn out of its shell using its hard operculum, or hard, rocky lid, to which it is firmly attached. The operculum is not edible, and must be discarded along with the animal's shell after eating.

References

See also
 Turbo cornutus

Turbinidae